Juan Carlos Maneglia is a Paraguayan film maker. A member of the Maneglia Schémbori duo, Juan Carlos Maneglia is the most recognized reference in the Paraguayan film industry, along with  Tana Schémbori with whom he has co-directed since its inception short films, telefilms, television series, and the two renowned Paraguayan fiction feature films,  7 Boxes and The Gold Seekers.

Life and career 
He finished his secondary studies at Cristo Rey School. He earned a Bachelor of Science in communication. He made his first short film at age 11 using a Super 8 camera. His passion for directing Super 8 film led him to make short films regardless of the format - VHS, film, and digital - and winning national and international awards. In 1991 he was awarded with a scholarship from the International School of Cinema and TV in San Antonio de los Baños, Cuba and in 1999, he went to an intensive film workshop at the prestigious NYFA, on an awarded scholarship from UNESCO.

Filmography

7 Boxes 
7 Boxes (Spanish: 7 Cajas) is the highest-grossing film in the history of Paraguayan cinema until the present time. It was nominated for the Goya Awards in 2013, an it premiered at the 2012 Toronto International Film Festival and 2012 Stockholm International Film Festival.  It has won more than 29 international awards, and participated in more than 136 festivals as of 2014. It has premiered in commercial movie theaters in the United States, Spain, Bolivia, Brazil, France, and Mexico, in this last country it was in 29 cinema rooms of the largest chain in the country.

The Gold Seekers  
The Gold Seekers (Spanish: Los Buscadores) is a 2017 Paraguayan adventure film. It was selected as the Paraguayan entry for the Best Foreign Language Film at the 90th Academy Awards.

The film premiered in Paraguay, on 7 September 2017, and in its eighth week on the billboard exceeded 130,000 spectators. It became the second highest-grossing film of the year, behind "The Fate of the Furious", with 191,000 spectators; in the second highest grossing Paraguayan film in history, behind "7 Boxes" (261,000 spectators); and in the fourth most seen in Paraguay, according to the portal Ultracine.

Quotes 
- "It was not ... advice, but the first time I told my dad that I wanted to make movies, he said: 'My son, that sound[s] [to] me as if you want to be an astronaut.' It made me see that what I dreamed was very strange".

- "It is very beautiful to know that you can tell stories and people can identify with what you do. We started directing together 27 years ago. We always dream of a Paraguayan cinema that identifies with us, continuously, to find our identity."

Awards

Short films 

 ‘‘El pueblo te necesita’’ (1976) 
 ‘‘La indiferencia’’ (1977)
 ‘‘Napoleón’’ (1979)
 ‘‘Espacio’’ (1981)
 ‘‘Autorretrato’’ (1984)
 ‘‘24 horas en la vida de Brigitta von Scharkoppen’’ (1984), with Ricardo Migliorisi.
 ‘‘Caza de Brujas’’ (1984)
 ‘‘Artroscopia, investigación en Medicina’’ (1986)
 ‘‘Presos’’ (1987)
 ‘‘Bocetos’’ (1987)
 ‘‘Espejos’’ (1987)
 ‘‘Todos conocemos el final’’ (1988)
 ‘‘La Noche de San Blas’’ (1989)
 ‘‘Sobrevivencia’’ (1990)
 ‘‘La clase de órgano’’ (1990) with Tana Schémbori. 
 ‘‘Artefacto de primera necesidad’’ (1995), with Tana Schémbori
 ‘‘Horno’’ (1998)
 ‘‘Ejercicios de estilo’’ (1999), USA
 ‘‘Say Yes’’ (1999)
 ‘‘Vampiros en el IMA’’ (1999), con Tana Schémbori
 ‘‘Extraños vecinos’’ (1999), USA
 ‘‘Tana Schémbori: Retrospectiva’’ (1999)
 ‘‘Villa Ko’eyu’’ (2000), with Tana Schémbori
 ‘‘La decisión de Nora’’ (2000), with Tana Schémbori
 ‘‘Amor-basura’’ (2000), with Tana Schémbori
 ‘‘La cartera’’ (2000), with Tana Schémbori
 ‘‘Tercer Timbre’’ (2001)
 ‘‘Horno ardiente’’ (2002), with Tana Schémbori
 ‘‘Cándida’’ (2003), with Tana Schémbori

TV 

 ‘‘González vs Bonetti’’ (2005, Telefuturo), with Tana Schémbori
 ‘‘GvsB: La revancha’’ (2005, Telefuturo), with Tana Schémbori
 ‘‘La Chuchi’’ (2006, Canal 13), with Tana Schémbori

See also
Cinema of Paraguay

References

External links

Paraguayan film directors
Silver Condor Award for Best Ibero-American Film winners
Living people
1966 births